Vampire Sisters is a 2012 German children's film by Wolfgang Groos. The fantasy-comedy film based on the eponymous novel series by Franziska Gehm.

Plot
The two twelve year old half-vampire sisters Silvania and Dakaria Tepes move from Transylvania to a small German town, together with their father Mihai (a vampire) and their mother Elvira (a human). This is a culture shock for the two very dissimilar sisters. While Darkaria does not fit in the human world, Silvania is enjoying her humanness. In the school they find no right connection, although between Jacob and Silvania, a little romance seems to develop. The hard of hearing Helene, who hides her disability however is Darkaria's only friend.

Dirk van Kombast, a neighbor of the family, finds something wrong with its neighbors and orders himself Vampire Hunter equipment over the Internet. When finally even Dakarias flight competition to fail is doomed because she has not enough air force as a half-vampire and Jacob because of the acute danger of sunburn, Silvania cannot visit the swimming pool, the two want to change their situation. By chance, they discover Schick, which can meet them a heart's desire in the shop of Ali. Although he warns them that the wishes are dangerous, but the two are sure: Silvania wants to become a real human, Dakaria a real vampire. But Ali bin accidentally swapped the wishes of Schick.

So there are numerous complications: Silvania wants to drink blood of Jacobs, Dakaria is being bullied by the bullies of the school and can not defend themselves. They are desperately looking for Ali bin Schick. His grandson, Ludo, coincidentally a classmate of the two, is the formula for an antidote. To achieve this, they need a flower, picked only at midnight and servers allows a new passion. Along with Helene, that initiate them after a brief interlude in their secret, searching for the flower on the cemetery. But Dirk van Kombast comes to them in the way. Eventually they succeed but with the help of Ludo, who turns out to be visionaries, to overcome Dirk and grab the flower. The two have learned from their cause and return to half vampire.

Cast
 Marta Martin as Silvania Tepes
 Laura Roge as Dakaria Tepes
 Christiane Paul as Elvira Tepes
 Stipe Erceg as Mihai Tepes
 Michael Kessler as Dirk van Kombast
 Richy Müller as Ali Bin Schick
 Jamie Bick as Elena Steinbrück
 Xaver Wegler as Benny Hartwig
 Hans-Peter Deppe as Grandfather Gustav
 Regine Vergeen as Grandmother Rose
 Ise Strambowski as Sra. Hase
 Viola von der Burg as Master Sra. Renneberg
 Gudrun Gundelach as Master vampire

Production
The film is based on the homonymous novel series by Franziska Gehm and is a production of Campbell + Wairimu + Plaster Film Productions, in co-production with Columbia Pictures. The film was promoted by the FilmFernsehFonds Bavaria, the Film and Media Foundation North Rhine-Westphalia, the Film Promotion Institute, and the German Film Fund.

Sequel
A sequel, titled Vampire Sisters 2: Bats in the Belly (Die Vampirschwestern 2 - Bats in the belly), was released in October 2014 in German cinemas, but didn't land in Dutch cinemas until July 2016.

References

External links
 
 Vampire Sisters on Cineuropa

2012 films
2012 fantasy films
German fantasy films
2010s German-language films
Vampire comedy films
German children's films
Films about families
2010s German films